Diede de Groot defeated the defending champion Yui Kamiji in the final, 7–6(8–6), 6–4 to win the women's singles wheelchair tennis title at the 2018 Australian Open.

Seeds

Draw

Draw

References 

General

 Drawsheets on ausopen.com

Specific

Wheelchair Women's Singles
2018 Women's Singles
2018 in women's tennis
2018 in Australian women's sport